Pachylasmatidae is a family of symmetrical sessile barnacles in the order Balanomorpha. There are about 10 genera and at least 30 described species in Pachylasmatidae.

Genera
These genera belong to the family Pachylasmatidae:
 Atetrapachylasma Newman & Jones, 2011
 Eolasma Buckeridge, 1983
 Eurylasma Jones, 2000
 Eutomolasma Jones, 2000
 Metalasma Jones, 2000
 Microlasma Jones, 2000
 Neoeolasma Gale, 2020
 Pachylasma Darwin, 1854
 Pseudoctomeris Poltarukha, 1996
 Tetrapachylasma Foster, 1988

References

Sessilia
Crustacean families